The Green Room is the debut album from DJ Shaky Bonez(a.k.a. D-Loc of the Kottonmouth Kings), released on September 4, 2001 with Suburban Noize Records.

Track listing

References

2001 debut albums